Sheep River Provincial Park is a provincial park located in Alberta, Canada,  west of Turner Valley on highway 546. It is part of the Kananaskis Country park system and encompasses a portion of the Sheep River valley.

Located on the eastern slopes of the Rocky Mountains, the park includes the Sheep River Wildlife Sanctuary, which provides permanent habitat for bighorn sheep, while the eastern part of the reserve extends to the Foothills Natural Region, offering summer range for elk and deer.

Activities
The following activities are available in the park:

Camping at Sandy McNabb and Bluerock campgrounds.
Cross-country skiing on the Sandy McNabb trails.
Fishing for brown, bull, cutthroat and rainbow trout, longnose dace, northern pearl dace, longnose sucker, mountain sucker, mountain whitefish and spoonhead sculpin on the Sheep River.
Hiking on a wide variety of trails: 9999, Bighorn, Bluerock, Bluerock Creek, Curley Sands, Death Valley, Foran Grade, Gorge Creek, Green Mountain, Hog's Back, Indian Oils, Junction Creek, Junction Mountain, Link Creek, Missinglink, Mist Creek, Mount McNabb, North Fork, Phone Line, Price Camp, Sandy McNabb, Sheep, South Gorge Creek, Threepoint Creek, Threepoint Mountain, Volcano Creek, Volcano Ridge, Ware Creek, Wildhorse, Windy Point, Wolf Creek.
Horseback riding on most trails.
Ice skating at Sandy McNabb campground.
Mountain biking on most trails.

See also
List of provincial parks in Alberta
List of Canadian provincial parks
List of National Parks of Canada

References

External links

Park page at Alberta Community Development

Provincial parks of Alberta
Kananaskis Improvement District